John Albert Raven FRS FRSE (born 25 June 1941) is a British botanist, and emeritus professor at University of Dundee and the University of Technology Sydney.  His primary research interests lie in the ecophysiology and biochemistry of marine and terrestrial primary producers such as plants and algae.

Education
Raven was educated at the Friends' School, Saffron Walden and St John's College, Cambridge, receiving a Bachelor of Arts degree in Botany in 1963.  He remained at Cambridge to complete a PhD in Botany (plant biophysics) in 1967, specialising in the membrane transport processes and bioenergetics of giant-celled algae.

Career
After a period as a lecturer at Cambridge, Raven moved to the University of Dundee in 1971, and he remained at Dundee until his formal retirement in 2008.  He was appointed there to a personal chair in 1980, and was the John Boyd Baxter Professor of Biology from 1995 until 2008. In 1978, Raven was a co-founding editor of the influential peer reviewed scientific journal Plant, Cell & Environment with Paul Jarvis, David Jennings, Harry Smith and Bob Campbell.

Research
Raven's research investigates algal life forms in the upper levels of the ocean, which underpin marine ecosystems and recycle carbon. He has explored how carbon dioxide, light and trace minerals interact to limit primary productivity in algae. Raven has research interests that range from organism-level bioenegetics, biochemistry and ecophysiology, through to wider-scale biogeochemistry, palaeoecology and even astrobiology.  To date, he has published more than 300 refereed research papers, over 50 book chapters, the book Energetics and Transport in Aquatic Plants (1984), and, together with Paul Falkowski, the influential textbook Aquatic Photosynthesis (1997, 2007).  In 2005, Raven led a Royal Society review of the state and implications of ongoing ocean acidification. , Raven is active in both research and teaching, despite officially retiring in 2008 when he warned:

Awards and honours
He was elected a Fellow of the Royal Society of Edinburgh (FRSE) in 1981.

He was elected President of the Botanical Society of Edinburgh for 1986–88.

He was elected a Fellow of the Royal Society (FRS) in 1990, for which his certificate of election reads: 

He was also a recipient of the Award of Excellence from Phycological Society of America  in 2002 and made an Honorary Life Member of the British Phycological Society in 2006.

References

Bibliography

External links
 University of Dundee

1941 births
Fellows of the Royal Society
Fellows of the Royal Society of Edinburgh
20th-century British botanists
Alumni of St John's College, Cambridge
Living people
Academics of the University of Dundee
People educated at Friends School Saffron Walden
21st-century British botanists